Golf Widows is a 1928 American silent comedy film directed by Erle C. Kenton and starring Vera Reynolds, Harrison Ford and Sally Rand.

Cast
 Vera Reynolds as Alice Anderson 
 Harrison Ford as Charles Bateman 
 John Patrick as Billy Gladstone 
 Sally Rand as Mary Ward 
 Kathleen Key as Ethel Dixon 
 Vernon Dent as Ernest Ward 
 Will Stanton as John Dixon

References

Bibliography
 Munden, Kenneth White. The American Film Institute Catalog of Motion Pictures Produced in the United States, Part 1. University of California Press, 1997.

External links
 

1928 films
1928 comedy films
1920s English-language films
American silent feature films
Silent American comedy films
American black-and-white films
Films directed by Erle C. Kenton
Columbia Pictures films
1920s American films